The Treaty of Sofia was signed between the Principality of Bulgaria and Kingdom of Serbia on 31 March 1904. It was made up of two separate agreements regarding political and economical issues and first came into effect in April 1904. The second trade agreement was signed the following year. Influential Serbian politician Nikola Pašić sought to halt Austro-Hungarian influence. The alliance was unrealized due to Austro-Hungarian pressure and deteriorating Bulgarian–Serbian relations.

References

1904 treaties
20th-century military alliances
Treaties of the Principality of Bulgaria
Treaties of the Kingdom of Serbia
Military alliances involving Bulgaria
Military alliances involving Serbia
1904 in Bulgaria
1904 in Serbia
Bulgaria–Serbia relations
Austria-Hungary–Serbia relations
Economy of the Kingdom of Serbia
March 1904 events